Victor Ciobanu (born 7 October 1992) is a Moldovan Greco-Roman wrestler. He won the gold medal in the 60 kg event at the 2021 World Wrestling Championships held in Oslo, Norway. He is the first wrestler representing Moldova to win a gold medal in Greco-Roman wrestling at the World Wrestling Championships.

In 2018, he won the silver medal in the same event at the World Wrestling Championships held in Budapest, Hungary. He also won the gold medal in his event at the 2019 European Wrestling Championships in Bucharest, Romania. In 2021, he represented Moldova at the 2020 Summer Olympics in Tokyo, Japan.

Career 

Ciobanu won one of the bronze medals in the 55 kg event at the 2012 European Juniors Wrestling Championships held in Zagreb, Croatia. In 2013, he lost his bronze medal match in the 55 kg event at the European Wrestling Championships held in Tbilisi, Georgia. In that same year, he also represented Moldova at the Summer Universiade in Kazan, Russia and he won the silver medal in the 55 kg event. A few months later, he was eliminated in his second match in the 55 kg event at the 2013 World Wrestling Championships held in Budapest, Hungary.

Ciobanu won the silver medal in the 59 kg event at the 2014 European Wrestling Championships held in Vantaa, Finland. He also competed at World Wrestling Championships in 2015 and 2017 but he did not win a medal on these occasions. In 2015, he won the gold medal in his event at the 2015 European U23 Wrestling Championships held in Walbrzych, Poland. A few months later, he lost his bronze medal match in the 59 kg event at the 2015 European Games held in Baku, Azerbaijan. In 2016, he competed at the World Olympic Qualification Tournament in Ulaanbaatar, Mongolia hoping to qualify for the 2016 Summer Olympics in Rio de Janeiro, Brazil. He won his first match but then lost his next match against Stig-André Berge of Norway. Berge went on to win one of the bronze medals in the 59 kg event at the 2016 Summer Olympics. At the 2018 World Wrestling Championships held in Budapest, Hungary, Ciobanu won the silver medal in the 60 kg event.

At the 2019 European Wrestling Championships held in Bucharest, Romania, he won the gold medal in the 60 kg event. In 2019, he also represented Moldova at the European Games in Minsk, Belarus and he won one of the bronze medals in the 60 kg event.

In 2020, he competed in the 63 kg event at the European Wrestling Championships held in Rome, Italy where he was eliminated in his first match by Erik Torba of Hungary. Torba went on to win one of the bronze medals. In the same year, he competed in the men's 60 kg event at the Individual Wrestling World Cup held in Belgrade, Serbia.

In January 2021, he won the gold medal in the 63 kg event at the Grand Prix Zagreb Open held in Zagreb, Croatia. In March 2021, he competed at the European Qualification Tournament in Budapest, Hungary hoping to qualify for the 2020 Summer Olympics in Tokyo, Japan. He did not qualify at this tournament but, in May 2021, he was able to qualify for the Olympics at the World Olympic Qualification Tournament held in Sofia, Bulgaria. He lost his bronze medal match in the 60 kg event at the 2020 Summer Olympics. He won his first two matches, against Kerem Kamal of Turkey and Zholaman Sharshenbekov of Kyrgyzstan, without conceding a single point. He then lost 0 – 11 against Luis Orta of Cuba and in his bronze medal match he lost against Sergey Emelin of the ROC.

Two months after the Olympics, he won the gold medal in his event at the 2021 World Wrestling Championships held in Oslo, Norway. In the final, he defeated Zholaman Sharshenbekov of Kyrgyzstan.

In 2022, he won the silver medal in his event at the Vehbi Emre & Hamit Kaplan Tournament held in Istanbul, Turkey. He also competed in the 63 kg event at the 2022 European Wrestling Championships in Budapest, Hungary where he was eliminated in his second match. A few months later, he won the silver medal in his event at the Matteo Pellicone Ranking Series 2022 held in Rome, Italy.

Achievements

References

External links 

 
 
 

1992 births
Living people
People from Florești District
Moldovan male sport wrestlers
European Wrestling Championships medalists
World Wrestling Championships medalists
Universiade medalists in wrestling
Universiade silver medalists for Moldova
Medalists at the 2013 Summer Universiade
Wrestlers at the 2015 European Games
Wrestlers at the 2019 European Games
European Games bronze medalists for Moldova
European Games medalists in wrestling
Wrestlers at the 2020 Summer Olympics
Olympic wrestlers of Moldova
21st-century Moldovan people